Luca Ceci (born ) is an Italian male  track cyclist, riding for the national team. He competed in the sprint and team sprint event at the 2010 UCI Track Cycling World Championships.

References

External links
 Profile at cyclingarchives.com

1988 births
Living people
Italian track cyclists
Italian male cyclists
Place of birth missing (living people)
Sportspeople from the Province of Ascoli Piceno
People from Ascoli Piceno
Cyclists from Marche